N'djili Airport , also known as N'Djili International Airport and Kinshasa International Airport, serves the city of Kinshasa and is the largest of the four international airports in the Democratic Republic of the Congo (DRC). It is named after the nearby Ndjili River.

History

The airport was inaugurated in 1953.

In 1998, N'Djili airport was the site of one of the decisive battles of the Second Congo War. Rebel forces advancing on Kinshasa infiltrated the airport perimeter but were repelled by Zimbabwean troops and aircraft arriving to support the government of Laurent Kabila.

In June 2015, a new international terminal was opened which can service one million passengers per year. Some computerized upgrades to the arrivals terminal have been implemented in recent years, although corruption remains a problem.

Airlines and destinations

Passenger

Cargo

Accidents and incidents 
 On 18 August 1968, Douglas DC-3D 9Q-CUM of Air Congo was destroyed by fire.
 On 28 August 1984, Vickers Viscount 9Q-CPD of Zaire Aero Service crashed after takeoff.
 On 15 April 1997, a Douglas DC-3 was hijacked at N'djili Airport. There were six to eight hijackers.
 On 26 July 2002, in the 2002 Africa One Antonov An-26 crash, 9Q-CMC was written off without fatalities
 On 13 January 2006, in the ZS-FUN, Learjet 24F accident, an Air Ambulance mission operated by SOS Air Rescue Africa, ZS-FUN was on final approach and cleared to land for a medical evacuation. Upon touchdown the left undercarriage collapsed due to a recent rain which caused an aquaplane. Both pilots and medical crew survived without injury. A secondary aircraft was dispatched after the accident to transfer the patient to Johannesburg, South Africa. The mentioned aircraft remained in Kinshasa for repairs and sold afterwards.
 On 4 October 2007, Antonov An-26 9Q-COS of Africa One Congo crashed shortly after take-off from N'djili Airport, killing at least 51 people and injuring a further 30.
 On 2 January 2010, Boeing 727-231F 9Q-CAA of Compagnie Africaine d'Aviation was substantially damaged when it departed the side of the runway.
 On 21 June 2010, Hewa Bora Airways Flight 601, operated by McDonnell Douglas MD-82 9Q-COQ burst a tyre on take-off. Hydraulic systems and port engine were damaged and the nose gear did not lower when the aircraft returned to N'djili. All 110 people on board escaped uninjured. The airline blamed the state of the runway for the accident, but investigators found no fault with the runway.
 On 4 April 2011, a Canadair CRJ-100ER 4L-GAE of Georgian Airways operating under an UN mission as flight 834 from Bangoka International Airport, Kisangani to Kinshasa missed the runway on landing at Kinshasa.  The aircraft subsequently broke into pieces and caught fire.  Only one survivor was reported out of 29 passengers and 4 crew.  The airport was experiencing torrential rain, thunderstorms and low visibility at the time.
 On 20 December 2018 a Gomair An-26 registration 9S-AGB crashed 19 nautical miles short of Kinshasa with 7 or 8 people on board. The aircraft was found more than 24 hours later by a local. The aircraft was carrying election materials on behalf of the Central Electoral National Independent Commission (CENI).

References

External links

 
 
 

Airports in Kinshasa
Buildings and structures in Kinshasa
Airfields of the United States Army Air Forces Air Transport Command in Central and South Africa
Airfields of the United States Army Air Forces
World War II airfields in the Belgian Congo
Space Shuttle Emergency Landing Sites